Nikolaus Heinrich Ferdinand Herbert, Prince of Bismarck (born Nikolaus Heinrich Ferdinand Herbert Graf von Bismarck-Schönhausen; 28 December 1849 – 18 September 1904) was a German politician, who served as Foreign Secretary from 1886 to 1890. His political career was closely tied to that of his father, Otto von Bismarck, and he left office a few days after his father's dismissal. He succeeded his father as the 2nd Prince of Bismarck in 1898. He was born in Berlin and died in Friedrichsruh.

Early life
Herbert von Bismarck born in Berlin, the oldest son of Otto von Bismarck and his wife, Johanna, née von Puttkamer. He had an older sister, Marie (b. 1847), and a younger brother, Wilhelm (b. 1852). He fought in the Franco-Prussian War, sustaining a bullet wound through the left leg during a cavalry charge at the Battle of Mars-La-Tour. He joined the diplomatic service in 1874 on his father's wishes. Bismarck attempted to gain influence with the heir to the German throne, Prince Wilhelm, by appealing to his narcissism. In June 1884, he wrote to thank Wilhelm for a portrait that Wilhelm had given to him after they returned from a state visit to Russia: 

Bismarck became Under-Secretary and acting head of the Foreign Office in 1885, and the following year, he was appointed the State Secretary for Foreign Affairs. He additionally was appointed Minister of State of the Kingdom of Prussia in 1888. He once said, "My father is the only person who can handle this business" In 1890, when Kaiser Wilhelm II called for the resignation of Otto von Bismarck as Chancellor, Herbert von Bismarck also resigned as State Secretary, despite Wilhelm attempts to retain him so that his de facto dismissal of his father would "look better in the eyes of the world".

Personal life
Bismarck had wanted to marry Princess Elisabeth von Carolath-Beuthen in 1881, but his father would not allow it, as she was a Catholic divorcée and was ten years older than Herbert. The Chancellor pressured his son with tears, blackmail and threats to disinherit him by getting Kaiser Wilhelm I to change the primogeniture statutes. That experience left Herbert a very bitter and alcoholic man. He once shot five bullets through a Foreign Office window, to be told he may have hit someone. He replied, "Officials have to be kept in a permanent state of irritation and alarm; the moment that ceases they stop working".

On 21 June 1892 in Vienna, he married Countess Marguerite, Countess of Hoyos, a member of the originally-Spanish House of Hoyos from Hungary. She herself was half-English and a grand-daughter of Robert Whitehead, the inventor of the torpedo. They had five children: 

Countess Hannah Leopoldine Alice von Bismarck-Schönhausen (1893–1971), married Leopold von Bredow (1875–1933)
Countess Maria Goedela von Bismarck-Schönhausen (1896–1981), married Hermann Graf Keyserling (1880-1946)
HSH Otto Christian Archibald, Prince von Bismarck (1897–1975), married Ann-Mari Tengbom (1907–1999)
Count Gottfried Alexander Georg Herbert von Bismarck-Schönhausen (1901–1949), married Countess Melanie, Countess of Hoyos (1916–1949)
Count Albrecht Edzard Heinrich Karl von Bismarck-Schönhausen (1903–1970), married Mona Travis Strader (1897–1983).

He was at his father's bedside when the latter died on 30 July 1898, at 10:57 p.m.

He died in Friedrichsruh.

The capital of the German colonial administration of German New Guinea was called Herbertshöhe (now Kokopo) in his honor.

Orders and decorations
German honours

Foreign honours

Notes

References

1849 births
1904 deaths
Politicians from Berlin
People from the Province of Brandenburg
Herbert
Herbert
German Protestants
Free Conservative Party politicians
Foreign Secretaries of Germany
Members of the 6th Reichstag of the German Empire
Members of the 9th Reichstag of the German Empire
Members of the 10th Reichstag of the German Empire
Members of the 11th Reichstag of the German Empire
Members of the Prussian House of Lords
Corps students
Children of national leaders
Prussian Army personnel
German military personnel of the Franco-Prussian War
Recipients of the Iron Cross, 2nd class
Commanders of the Order of Franz Joseph
Grand Crosses of the Order of the Dannebrog
Knights Grand Cross of the Order of Saints Maurice and Lazarus
Recipients of the Order of the Crown (Italy)
Grand Cordons of the Order of the Rising Sun
Recipients of the Order of the Medjidie, 1st class
Knights Grand Cross of the Order of the Immaculate Conception of Vila Viçosa
Grand Crosses of the Order of the Star of Romania
Recipients of the Order of St. Anna, 2nd class
Commanders Grand Cross of the Order of the Polar Star